St. John's Guild Seaside Hospital began with an 1879 land purchase and ended after the hospital was sold in 1951 and subsequently demolished.

History

The Staten Island land acquired along the shore of New Dorp Beach was used for what became St. John's Guild Seaside Hospital.
Although the hospital was not dedicated until June 1899, the prior year, in September, they reported handling 255 newborns.

References

  

Defunct hospitals in Staten Island
Demolished buildings and structures in Staten Island
Buildings and structures demolished in 1951
Children's hospitals in New York (state)